Mats Persson (born 27 November 1980) is a Swedish politician for the Liberal party. Since 18 October 2022, he is the Minister for Education in the Ulf Kristersson Cabinet.

He has been a Member of the Riksdag since 2014, elected for the southern constituency of Skåne County. He was formerly vice-president of the Liberal Youth of Sweden.

Between 2009 and 2014, he was a regional councillor for the Liberals in Region Scania. Persson was elected to the Liberal Party Board in 2011 and was the party's economic policy spokesman from May 2016 to February 2019. He returned to this role in August 2019.

Biography
Persson completed his PhD in economic history at Lund University in 2015 with a thesis on sickness absence and early retirement among immigrants in Sweden during the period of 1981-2003.

Member of the Riksdag
Persson has been a Member of the Riksdag since the 2014 elections and Liberal parliamentary group leader in the Riksdag since April 2022.

Persson was a member of the Committee on Finance from 2016 to 2019, and has been a member of the Committee again since 2019 after a break. Persson was a member of the Committee on Taxation from 2014-2016 and the Committee on Education in 2019. He is or has been an alternate member of the Committee on the Labour Market, the Committee on European Union Affairs, the Committee on Finance, the Committee on Taxation, the Committee on Social Insurance, and the Committee on Transport and Communications, among others.

Bibliography
 2006 –  
 2015 –

References

1980 births
Living people
Members of the Riksdag 2014–2018
Members of the Riksdag 2018–2022
Members of the Riksdag 2022–2026
Members of the Riksdag from the Liberals (Sweden)
Swedish Ministers for Education